Heyran or Hairan may refer to:
 Heyran, Hamadan
 Heyran, West Azerbaijan
 Heyran-e Olya (disambiguation)
 Heyran-e Sofla, Gilan Province
 Heyran-e Vosta, Gilan Province
 Heyran Rural District, in Gilan Province